Death row most commonly refers to the section of a prison where inmates await execution, or the state of awaiting execution ("being on death row").

Death row may also refer to:

In film and television
Deathrow (film), a 2000 film produced by GMA Films
On Death Row, British TV series by Werner Herzog

In games

 Deathrow (video game), a 2002 alternative sports video game for Xbox
 DeathRow, a Quake esports team featuring first pro online gamer Dennis Fong

In music

Artists and labels
Death Row Records, a record label started by Dr. Dre and Marion "Suge" Knight
Deathrow, a German thrash metal group

Works
Death Row (album), an album by Accept
Death Row Greatest Hits, a greatest hits album by Death Row Records
Death Row: Snoop Doggy Dogg at His Best, a greatest hits album by Snoop Dogg
"Death Row", a song by Judas Priest from Jugulator
"Death Row", a song by Thomas Rhett, Tyler Hubbard, and Russell Dickerson from Where We Started
"Death Row", a song by Bebe Rexha from Better Mistakes
"Death Row", a song by Chris Stapleton from From A Room: Volume 1
"Death Row", a song by Young Dolph from Rich Slave
"Deathrow (No Regrets)", a song by Hypocrisy, from Into the Abyss

See also
List of death row inmates in the United States